Reverend George Lillie Wodehouse Fauquier (30 November 1798 – 26 February 1887) was an English first-class cricketer who had a four-match career for Cambridge University between 1819 and 1821.

Born in Hampton Court to Thomas Fauquier and Charlotte Townshend, he was one of ten children, and attended Pembroke College, Cambridge. He scored the majority of his 29 career runs on 24 May 1819, against Cambridge Town Club, and managed to take four wickets in each of the next two seasons. He went on to become a vicar of West Haddon in Northamptonshire, authoring Readings and Addresses To Be Used With the Order for the Visitation of the Sick in 1869.

References

External links

Bibliography
 Arthur Haygarth, Scores & Biographies, Volume 1 (1744–1826), Lillywhite, 1862

1799 births
1887 deaths
English cricketers
English cricketers of 1787 to 1825
Cambridge University cricketers
Alumni of Pembroke College, Cambridge
19th-century English Anglican priests
People from the London Borough of Richmond upon Thames
People from West Haddon